Cerocorticium molle is a species of crust fungus in the family Meruliaceae.

Taxonomy
The fungus was first described by Miles Berkeley and Moses Ashley Curtis in 1868 as Corticium molle. They described the fruit body of the type specimen as resembling "a thin coating of wax poured over the surface". It was transferred to genus Cerocorticium by Walter Jülich in 1975.

Habitat and distribution
Cerocorticium molle grows on the dead bark and wood of a variety of angiosperms, and it has occasionally been recorded growing on or under the bark of living trees. It is found in tropical and subtropical regions of Africa, Asia, North America, and South America.

References

Meruliaceae
Fungi described in 1868
Fungi of Asia
Fungi of Africa
Fungi of North America
Fungi of South America
Taxa named by Miles Joseph Berkeley
Taxa named by Moses Ashley Curtis